William Lambe may refer to:
 William Lambe (physician), English physician and early veganism activist
 William Lambe (philanthropist), English cloth merchant and philanthropist
 T. William Lambe, American geotechnical engineer

See also
 William Lamb (disambiguation)